The Correspondents was the longest-running Philippine weekly investigative documentary show of ABS-CBN. The series aired from November 10, 1998 to October 19, 2010 replacing The Inside Story and was replaced by Patrol ng Pilipino. It brought an in-depth look at the lives of people as they lived, going through hardships and celebrating their joys. "Ang Huling Pagtatanghal" served as the last show episode. The show aired for 11 years and 11 months.

Hosts

Main hosts
Karen Davila
Abner Mercado

Guest hosts

Dominic Almelor
Sol Aragones
Atom Araullo
Adrian Ayalin
Jeff Canoy
Ricky Carandang
Jorge Cariño
Jing Castañeda
Dyan Castillejo
Niña Corpuz 
Gretchen Malalad
Henry Omaga-Diaz
Alex Santos
Nadia Trinidad
Tony Velasquez
Ron Cruz
Anthony Taberna
Ted Failon
Julius Babao
Pinky Webb
Gus Abelgas
Rico Yan

Previous hosts
Mari Kaimo (moved to CBN Asia and Eagle Broadcasting Corporation, later transitioned to TV acting)
Ces Drilon (moved to host for I Survived)
Erwin Tulfo (moved to TV5; later transitioned to DSWD Secretary)
Jim Libiran (former TV reporter turned independent film director & producer)
Ed Lingao (moved to TV5; later to GMA Network and GMA News TV (now relaunched as GTV); now returned to TV5)
Jade Lopez
Patrick Paez (moved to TV5)
Anne Torres (moved to TV5, now a producer at Bloomberg Television (USA))
Bernadette Sembrano (moved to host for Salamat Dok)
Korina Sanchez (1998–2000)

Awards and nominations
 Winner, Best TV Documentary (Abner Mercado's Team)- Population Development Media Awards (2009)
 Nominated, Best Documentary Program - PMPC Star Awards for Television (2009)
 Nominated, Best Documentary Program Host - PMPC Star Awards for Television (2009)
 Nominated, Best Documentary Program - PMPC Star Awards for Television (2008)
 Nominated, Best Documentary Program Host - PMPC Star Awards for Television (2008)
 Runner-up, Best TV Documentary (Bernadette Sembrano's Team) - Population Development Media Awards (2008)
 Runner-up, Best TV Documentary (Karen Davila's Team) - Population Development Media Awards (2008)
 Winner, Best Magazine Program - 29th Catholic Mass Media Awards (2007)
 Nominated, Best Documentary Program - PMPC Star Awards for Television (2007)
 Winner, Best Documentary Program - PMPC Star Awards for Television (2006)
 Nominated, Best Documentary Program - PMPC Star Awards for Television (2005)
 Winner, Best Documentary Program - PMPC Star Awards for Television (2004)
 Winner, Best Documentary Program - PMPC Star Awards for Television (2003)

ABS-CBN News and Current Affairs shows
ABS-CBN original programming
Philippine documentary television series
1998 Philippine television series debuts
2010 Philippine television series endings
1990s Philippine television series
2000s Philippine television series
Filipino-language television shows